Sujan Mahmud is a film editor and sound designer in Bangladesh. He is a two time National Film Award (Bangladesh) winner.

Early life and career
At the age of 25, Sujan Mahmud made his mark to the film industry by editing Kittonkhola (2002). For his work in the film, he won best editor award at 25th Bangladesh National Film Awards. After that, he didn't look back. One after another he worked in Rupantor (2008), Britter Bairey (2009), Opekkha (2010), Meherjaan (2011), Bibek (2014), and Under Construction (2015). Besides these, he has edited internationally award-winning short film Statement After My Poet Husband's Death.

For his work in the film Britter Bairey (2009), he was awarded best sound recording award at 34th Bangladesh National Film Awards. Now he is working on some upcoming films.

Filmography

References 

Living people
Bangladeshi film editors
1975 births
Best Editor National Film Award (Bangladesh) winners